Katherine Marie Helmond (July 5, 1929 – February 23, 2019) was an American film and television actress. Over her five decades of television acting, she was known for her starring role as ditzy matriarch Jessica Tate on the ABC prime time soap opera sitcom Soap (1977–1981) and her co-starring role as feisty mother Mona Robinson on Who's the Boss? (1984–1992). She also played Doris Sherman on Coach and Lois Whelan, the mother of Debra Barone on Everybody Loves Raymond. She also appeared as a guest on talk and variety shows.

Helmond had supporting roles in films such as Alfred Hitchcock's Family Plot (1976) and Terry Gilliam's Brazil (1985). She also voiced Lizzie in the three Cars films by Disney/Pixar.

Filmography

Television

Video games

References

Actress filmographies
American filmographies